Nelima elegans is a species of harvestman in the family Sclerosomatidae. It is found in North America.

References

External links

 
 

Harvestmen